Stefan Decker is a computer scientist, Full Professor for Database and Information Systems at RWTH Aachen University, and managing director of the Fraunhofer Institute for Applied Information Technology. He specializes in the Semantic Web. As of 25 January 2020, his research reached 21,206 (with h-index of 66 and i10-index of 201) Google Scholar Citations, making him one of the most influential Semantic Web researchers.

He was formerly Professor of Digital Enterprise at the National University of Ireland Galway, and executive director of the Digital Enterprise Research Institute, Galway. Prof. Decker studied Computer Science at the University of Kaiserslautern. He received his doctorate at the Karlsruhe Technical University.

He was elected to the Royal Irish Academy in 2010.

Selected research
Bischof, Stefan, et al. "Mapping between RDF and XML with XSPARQL." Journal on Data Semantics 1.3 (2012): 147–185.
Grosof, Benjamin N., et al. "Description logic programs: combining logic programs with description logic." Proceedings of the 12th international conference on World Wide Web. 2003.
Noy, Natalya F., et al. "Creating semantic web contents with protege-2000." IEEE intelligent systems 16.2 (2001): 60–71.
Decker, Stefan, et al. "The semantic web: The roles of XML and RDF." IEEE Internet Computing 4.5 (2000): 63–73.

References

External links

Article in the Irish Times
Interview for the General-Anzeiger

Academic staff of RWTH Aachen University
Semantic Web people
Karlsruhe Institute of Technology alumni
Members of the Royal Irish Academy
Year of birth missing (living people)
Living people